Hamningberg is an abandoned fishing village in Båtsfjord Municipality in Finnmark county, Norway. The village lies along the northern coast of the large Varanger Peninsula on the shores of the Barents Sea.  Its only road connection is through Vardø Municipality which is a rather long drive from the rest of Båtsfjord Municipality.  Hamningberg Chapel is located in the village, although now it is only rarely used.

Traditionally a fishing village, it is one of very few places in all of Finnmark county that was not burned down by the retreating Germans in the latter part of the Second World War. It was depopulated and abandoned in 1964, although some of the houses are still in use as summer cottages.

Media gallery

References

External links
 

Båtsfjord
Former populated places in Finnmark
Villages in Norway (depopulated)